Glanyrafon or Glanrafon is a small village and industrial estate in the community of Llanfarian, Ceredigion, Wales.

Glanyrafon is represented in the Senedd by Elin Jones (Plaid Cymru) and is part of the Ceredigion constituency in the House of Commons.

References

See also 
 Glanyrafon railway station
 List of localities in Wales by population

Villages in Ceredigion